In discrete geometry, Tverberg's theorem, first stated by , is the result that sufficiently many points in d-dimensional Euclidean space can be partitioned into subsets with intersecting convex hulls. Specifically, for any set of

points there exists a point x (not necessarily one of the given points) and a partition of the given points into r subsets, such that x belongs to the convex hull of all of the subsets. The partition resulting from this theorem is known as a Tverberg partition.

Examples
For r = 2, Tverberg's theorem states that any d + 2 points may be partitioned into two subsets with intersecting convex hulls; this special case is known as Radon's theorem. In this case, for points in general position, there is a unique partition.

The case r = 3 and d = 2 states that any seven points in the plane may be partitioned into three subsets with intersecting convex hulls. The illustration shows an example in which the seven points are the vertices of a regular heptagon. As the example shows, there may be many different Tverberg partitions of the same set of points; these seven points may be partitioned in seven different ways that differ by rotations of each other.

See also
Rota's basis conjecture

References
. 
.

Theorems in convex geometry
Theorems in discrete geometry
Geometric transversal theory
Convex hulls